Gene M. Gomes (January 22, 1946 – March 6, 2018) was an American judge.

Gomes was born in Fresno, California. He graduated from Fresno High School in 1963. Gomes received his bachelor's degree from Fresno State University in 1969 and then he received his Juris Doctor degree from McGeorge School of Law in 1972. He served as a deputy district attorney for Fresno County, California. Gomes practiced law in Fresno, California. In 1980, Gomes was appointed to the Fresno Municipal Court. Then, in 1982, he was appointed to the Fresno Superior Court. Gomes served on the California Courts of Appeal from 2002 until his death. Gomes died in Fresno, California.

Notes

1946 births
2018 deaths
People from Fresno, California
California State University, Fresno alumni
McGeorge School of Law alumni
Judges of the California Courts of Appeal
Respiratory disease deaths in California
20th-century American judges